The , often compared to the Aladdin Deck Enhancer, is an accessory released by Bandai for Nintendo's Super Famicom system and was released in 1996.

Overview
This device is designed to sit on top of the Super Famicom, and features two cartridge slots. The premise is that games could be produced at a much lower cost and development time, not having to rely on Nintendo for cartridge production. Unlike the Aladdin Deck Enhancer, this device was officially approved by Nintendo under the provision that Bandai handle all the hardware manufacturing itself.

The two cartridge slots are designed to share data between the games. The cartridge placed in slot 1 is the game that will be played, while the cartridge in slot 2 supplies additional data for use in the main game. Of the thirteen games released, nine of them can link up, within each game series.

Games that are linkable are identified by a yellow diagram showing a SuFami Turbo with either 1 or 2 cartridges in the lower left corner of the game box. If the picture has 1 cart plugged into the SuFami Turbo, it is not linkable. If it has 2 carts plugged into the SuFami Turbo then it is linkable with the games named on the box.

The SuFami Turbo was released as a standalone unit, or with a pack in game.

Games
Each of the 13 released games' boxes has a little picture in the lower left corner indicating whether linking is possible. The included pamphlet features Tetris 2 + Bombliss which was never released for the system, but as a standalone SNES game.

SD Gundam Generations
SD Gundam Generations is a series of 6 games, each containing a certain amount of unique Gundam fighters. With the main Gundam Generations game in slot 1, the player can use Gundam fighters from the cartridge in slot 2.

SD Ultra Battle
SD Ultra Battle is a beat 'em up game based on the Ultraman series which allows the player to use the characters from whichever cart was in slot 2, in the main game in slot 1. It links with other copies of the same game (Battle 1 links with Battle 1), allowing both players to use the same character and saved data, or with the opposing game using characters from both games. The first game is based on Ultraman, and the second is based on Ultra Seven.

Poi Poi Ninja
Poi Poi Ninja only links with other copies of Poi Poi Ninja, to share save data or character data for vs. battles.

See also
List of Super Nintendo Entertainment System accessories
Datach - a similar mini-cartridge adaptor, with additional barcode reader, but with only one cartridge slot (from Bandai, for Famicom)

External links

SuFami Turbo article on SNES Central
SuFami Turbo article on Retrospekt
BLEEP Radio - Episode 63. SuFami Turbo Discussion Towards the End

Super Nintendo Entertainment System accessories